Christina Hallowell Garrett was an academic and the main authority on the Marian exiles in 1938, English Protestant exiles during the reign of Mary I of England.

Selected works
 The Marian exiles, (1553-1559). A study in the origins of Elizabethan puritanism, 1938 
 The resurreccion of the masse, 1940
 The legatine register of Cardinal Pole, 1554-57, 1941

References

 http://evangelica.de/tag/christina-hallowell-garrett/

Women historians
Year of birth missing
Year of death missing